ISO/IEC 19752 Information technology — Method for the determination of toner cartridge yield for monochromatic electrophotographic printers and multi-function devices that contain printer components is an ISO/IEC standard method for the determination of toner cartridge yield for monochrome laser printers, introduced in June 2004 and updated in 2017.

Traditionally, printer manufacturers did not employ a standard, well-defined methodology for measuring toner cartridge yield. The most widely used description of cartridge capacity was "number of printed pages at 5% coverage", with final results depending on a number of factors.

In contrast, ISO/IEC 19752 strives for a comprehensive and rigorous definition of the measurement process with the purpose of creating clear and objective criteria for comparison of cartridge yields. In particular, the standard provides a detailed definition and description of:
 Test preparations and environmental conditions
 Sample size (at least 3 printers with 3 cartridges each)
 Paper type
 Print mode
 Test document (provided in PDF format)
 Cartridge and printer source (not supplied by manufacturer; purchased on the open market from at least three different sources)
 Error and process handling
 End-of-life criteria (for example, how many times the cartridges should be shaken)

See also 
 ISO/IEC JTC 1/SC 28

Sources 
 ISO/IEC 19752:2004 at www.iso.org
 ISO/IEC 19752:2017
 
 ISO Standard 19752:2004 Table

Computer printers
19752